Wadi is a census town in Kalaburagi district in the Indian state of Karnataka.The Wadi Town Has a 23 Municipal Ward. The Wadi Junction railway station is an important railway junction on the Indian railways.
Gulbarga, which is around 37 km via rail route and 40 km via roadway from Wadi
The railway line from Secunderabad to Wadi was started in 1874.

Geography
It has an average elevation of 411 metres (1348 feet).

Demographics
 India census, Wadi had a population of 120,000. Males constitute 51% of the population and females 49%. Wadi has an average literacy rate of 54%, lower than the national average of 59.5%: male literacy is 63% and female literacy is 45%. In Wadi, 14% of the population is under 6 years of age.

Tourism
Wadi is a tourist spot. Some of the attractions are the two Hanuman Temples, one in railway colony and the other situated at Konchur, a village 10 km from Wadi railway station. Also of interest are the Astaan E Quadri Halkatta Sharif Dargah, also 6 km from Wadi town, and the ACC cement plants, which use both the latest and obsolete technologies.

Transport
Wadi Junction railway station is on the Solapur-Guntakal line, which is part of Mumbai-Chennai line. Trains from the metro cities of Mumbai, Bengaluru, Hyderabad and Chennai pass through the city. It is also connected to Secunderabad by rail.

Income/Economy
Wadi is home to two cement plants of ACC, one of 2.6 mtpa (million tonnes per annum) capacity and the other 2.1 mtpa. These are some of the largest cement plants in the country.
Wadi is also famous for limestone mines.
Wadi is also an important railway junction.

The cement plants of ACC, the railways and the limestone have attracted people from diverse regions and cultures, in search of employment.

Educational Institutes
Wadi has a no. of educational institutions:
 Chakravarthy Kanavashila Vidya Varthaka Samsthe.
Dr.B R Ambedkar School
 St. Ambrose Convent School
 D.A.V Public School
 Al Ameen Urdu School
 Industrial Training Institute [ITI]
 National M. A. V. Primary School
 Mahatma Gandhi School
 Mini Rose
 V. P. Naik College
 Bahamani Kingdom Women's College
 Govt. High School
 Shri Shail Mallikaarjun Vidyaa Vardhak Sounsthey
 Balvikas Mandir Higher Primary School
 Mathoshri Kusumabai Devappa Dahihande Kannada Medium High School
 Mathoshri Ramabai Ambedkar Kanya Proudha Shaley

Business
Wadi Market is old. Thursdays are marked as the weekly market (or weekly shandy or vaara santhe) days, where people from nearby towns and villages visit for selling and buying daily essentials like vegetables, fruits, etc.

It's mainly held on road side near the railway ticket counter every Thursday from 9 am to around 6 pm, depending on availability of stock to be purchased.

Important landmarks are GOPALRAO INFO SOLUTIONS and KHANDELWAL RAJORE BUILDING,SARDARJI BUILDING,IRANI BUILDING ARE the oldest building in Wadi. It is close to Wadi Railway Junction.

References
*ACC Plant

Cities and towns in Kalaburagi district